Dar-i Noor may refer to:

Darai Nur District of Nangarhar Province, Afghanistan
Darai Nur, a town in Darai Nur District, Afghanistan, capital of the district
Daria-i-Noor, a diamond